Felipe de Jesús Ayala Armendáriz (born 16 December 1977) is a Mexican former professional footballer who played as a midfielder. Ayala played for five clubs. The clubs were Tigres de la UANL, Jaguares de Chiapas, Puebla F.C., Monarcas Morelia, and Correcaminos UAT (his retirement club).

Career

Tigres de la UANL
Felipe de Jesús Ayala Armendárizmade his debut during the 1995-96 in April on Tigres de la UANL against CD Veracruz, in which he won 2–0.

Jaguares de Chiapas
After retire from Tigres de la UANL in 2002, he went to Jaguares de Chiapas before his retirement in 2012.

Puebla F.C.
From 2004 to 2005, Felipe played in Puebla F.C. He retired until 2008, where he returned for the club. In March 2010, Felipe made an olympic goal against Team Cruz azul, having a victory for Puebla 4-1 before his retirement in 2011.

Monarcas Morelia
After his retirement from Puebla in 2011, He went to Monarcas Morelia before another retirement.

Correcaminos UAT
Correcaminos was the last club where he went after his 2012 retirements from Jaguares de Chiapas and Monarcas Morelia, and before his 2013 retirements.

External links
 

1978 births
Living people
Sportspeople from Monterrey
Footballers from Nuevo León
Association football midfielders
Mexico under-20 international footballers
Tigres UANL footballers
Chiapas F.C. footballers
Club Puebla players
Atlético Morelia players
Correcaminos UAT footballers
Liga MX players
Mexican footballers